Freshly Chopped, also simply called Chopped, is an Irish-headquartered restaurant chain, serving salads and other health foods.

History

The first Chopped opened on Baggot Street, Dublin in May 2012, founded by Brian Lee and Andy Chen. They began to franchise in 2016. In 2019 the company expanded to the United Kingdom and Cyprus.

Food

Freshly Chopped serve salads, cut with their signature mezzaluna knives.

References

External links
 Official website

Restaurants established in 2012
Fast-food chains of Ireland
Restaurants in the Republic of Ireland
2012 establishments in Ireland